Now Band-e Jadid (also Romanized as Now Band-e Jadīd) is a village in Gurband Rural District, in the Central District of Minab County, Hormozgan Province, Iran. At the 2006 census, its population was 1,436, in 326 families.

References 

Populated places in Minab County